The Stillman Diet is a high-protein, low-carbohydrate diet that was created in 1967 by physician Irwin Maxwell Stillman (1896–1975).

Overview

Stillman and Samm Sinclair Baker authored the book The Doctor's Quick Weight Loss Diet that first advertised the Stillman Diet in 1967. The animal based high-protein diet includes lean beef, veal, chicken, turkey, fish, eggs and non-fat cottage cheese. Spices, tabasco sauce, herbs, salt, and pepper are also allowed. Condiments, butter, dressings and any kind of fat or oil are not permitted. Tea, coffee, and non-caloric soft drinks can be consumed, but only in addition to the 8 daily glasses of water required. It's also recommended that dieters eat 6 small meals per day instead of 3 large ones.

The diet is a carbohydrate-restricted diet, similar to that of Dr. Robert Atkins',  Atkins Diet (although Atkins' diet allows significant fat consumption).

Karen Carpenter 

Karen Carpenter began using the diet in her teens. Karen was 5'4" and 145 pounds when she went on the Stillman Diet in 1967. In 1983, she died of complications related to anorexia nervosa.

Reception

The Stillman diet has been criticized by medical experts and nutritionists as a fad diet. Physician Terrence T. Kuske wrote regarding the Stillman diet:

It induces a degree of diuresis because of the low carbohydrate, but is a relatively unpalatable diet. Adherence to the diet induces fatigue, nausea and lassitude or exhaustion. Long-term use of this diet, because of its composition, may induce vitamin deficiency. Studies of individuals following the Stillman Diet have demonstrated quite conclusively that it raises the serum cholesterol, with its attendant risks.

See also
 List of diets
Scarsdale diet

References

Further reading 

Low-carbohydrate diets
Fad diets
High-protein diets